John Kidney (29 October 1888 – 18 October 1962) was a Barbadian cricketer. He played in eleven first-class matches for the Barbados cricket team from 1908 to 1932.

See also
 List of Barbadian representative cricketers

References

External links
 

1888 births
1962 deaths
Barbadian cricketers
Barbados cricketers
People from Saint Michael, Barbados